72 Seasons is the upcoming eleventh studio album by American heavy metal band Metallica. It is set for release on April 14, 2023, by their own label Blackened Recordings. 72 Seasons is produced by Greg Fidelman, who produced the band's previous studio album, Hardwired... to Self-Destruct (2016), and will be the band's second studio album to be released through Blackened.

Background
In an interview with Australian magazine The Musics official podcast in March 2019, bassist Robert Trujillo said that Metallica had begun jamming on new material for its next studio album. "I'm excited about the next record because I believe it will also be a culmination of the two [previous] records and another journey. There's no shortage of original ideas, that's the beauty of being in this band." He estimated that the album would be released "a lot sooner than the previous two did... this time around I think we'll be able to jump on it a lot quicker and jump in the studio and start working. We've all vowed to get this one going sooner than later."

In an interview with Australian magazine Mixdown the following month, guitarist Kirk Hammett said that the band had tentative plans to enter the studio after the conclusion of its WorldWired Tour in support of Hardwired... to Self-Destruct. He stated, "We're in our third year since Hardwired. Maybe we can get a bit more focus and go into the studio a bit sooner." Having not contributed any writing to Hardwired... to Self-Destruct after accidentally losing his phone containing riff ideas at Copenhagen Airport in 2014, Hammett said regarding his ideas for the new album, "I have a ton of material. I've over-compensated, so I'm ready to go anytime."

In April 2020, amidst the COVID-19 pandemic, drummer Lars Ulrich said in an interview with Marc Benioff that Metallica could work on its next studio album while in quarantine. Trujillo told The Vinyl Guide in June that the band was "excited about cultivating new ideas" for its new album. "We communicate every week, which is really great, so we have our connection intact [...] what we've started doing is basically just really concentrating on our home studios and being creative from our homes and navigating through ideas and building on new ideas. And that's where we're at right now". He also said that the band was working towards eventually entering a studio to record the album. In November, Ulrich said in an interview with Phoebe Bridgers for Rolling Stone that the band was "three, four weeks into some pretty serious writing" and stated that "It's the heaviest thing, the coolest [...] but all kidding aside, if it wasn't because we thought that the best record was still ahead of us, then why keep doing it?" He followed up in January 2021 by saying that progress on the album had been "glacial", while vocalist/guitarist James Hetfield said in March that "It's either touring or writing, so COVID chose for us [...] but, yeah, [we will release] a bunch of songs. We wrote quite a few songs".

Title
On November 28, 2022, Hetfield commented on the album's title:

Release and promotion
On November 28, 2022, Metallica announced the album's title, release date, tracklist and a promotional tour of North America and Europe, featuring Pantera, Five Finger Death Punch, Ice Nine Kills, Greta Van Fleet, Architects, Volbeat, and Mammoth WVH, titled the M72 World Tour. The band subsequently released the album's first single, "Lux Æterna", along with a music video.

On January 19, 2023, Metallica released a new music video for "Screaming Suicide".

After teasing a new song on TikTok over the last few days of February, Metallica released a new music video for "If Darkness Had a Son" on March 1, 2023. This song features the first writing credit for Kirk Hammett on a Metallica album since 2011's album, Lulu.

Track listing

Personnel
Metallica
 James Hetfield – vocals, rhythm guitar, production
 Lars Ulrich – drums, production
 Kirk Hammett – lead guitar
 Robert Trujillo – bass

Production 
 Greg Fidelman – production, mixing, recording
 Sara Lyn Killion  – engineering
 Jim Monti – engineering
 Jason Gossman – additional engineering, digital editing
 Kent Matcke – assistant engineering
 Dan Monti – digital editing
 Bob Ludwig – mastering
 David Turner – cover art

References

External links
 72 Seasons on the official Metallica website.

2023 albums
Metallica albums
Albums produced by Greg Fidelman
Self-released albums
Upcoming albums